Fraud: Gloria Macapagal-Arroyo and the May 2004 Elections is a 2006 book about the electoral scandal surrounding Gloria Macapagal Arroyo's 2004 reelection to the Philippine presidency. Published by the Center for People Empowerment in Governance Books (CenPEG Books), it was edited by the center's Policy Study director Bobby M. Tuazon, with the preface provided by Temario C. Rivera. The book received positive reviews from critics.

Critical response
Ina Alleco R. Silverio, writing for the news website Bulatlat, gave Fraud a positive review, praising its "staggering" collection of sources and straightforward presentation of evidence in its central argument that President Arroyo and her political allies committed electoral fraud during the 2004 presidential election. Silverio concluded that the book provides the lesson that a reliance on the legal system is not enough against "increasingly despotic regimes" that disregards the law for its own gain. Alexander Martin Remollino, a fellow Bulatlat contributor, also shares in the assessment that the book effectively "give[s] a total picture of how the controversial presidential poll of two years ago was desecrated. The patterns are there, the numbers are there – all pointing to a wholesale messing with the people's will."

References

2006 non-fiction books
Books about the Philippines
Electoral fraud in the Philippines
Non-fiction books about elections
Presidency of Gloria Macapagal Arroyo